Tash-Yelga (Taşyılğa) is a rural locality (a village) in Mayadykovsky Selsoviet, Dyurtyulinsky District, Bashkortostan, Russia. The population was 202 as of 2010. There is 1 street.

Geography 
Tash-Yelga is located 21 km northeast of Dyurtyuli (the district's administrative centre) by road. Burny Potok is the nearest rural locality.

References 

Rural localities in Dyurtyulinsky District